Cha Min-kyu  (Korean: 차민규, born 16 March 1993) is a South Korean speed skater who competes internationally.

Cha participated at the 2018 Winter Olympics and won a silver medal in the 500 metres race. He set the Olympic record for the event with a time of 34.42 seconds but had his record broken moments later by the eventual winner, Håvard Lorentzen who beat him by 0.01. He also competed at the 2022 Winter Olympics and won the silver in the 500 metres event with time of 34.39 seconds, which was only 0.07 seconds behind the gold medalist and new Olympic record holder, Gao Tingyu of China.

Personal records

Current South Korean record.

References

External links

1993 births
Living people
South Korean male speed skaters
Olympic speed skaters of South Korea
Speed skaters at the 2018 Winter Olympics
Speed skaters at the 2022 Winter Olympics
Medalists at the 2018 Winter Olympics
Medalists at the 2022 Winter Olympics
Olympic medalists in speed skating
Olympic silver medalists for South Korea
Speed skaters at the 2017 Asian Winter Games
Medalists at the 2017 Asian Winter Games
Asian Games medalists in speed skating
Asian Games bronze medalists for South Korea
People from Anyang, Gyeonggi
World Single Distances Speed Skating Championships medalists
Universiade gold medalists for South Korea
Universiade medalists in speed skating
Competitors at the 2017 Winter Universiade
World Sprint Speed Skating Championships medalists
Sportspeople from Gyeonggi Province